Walter C. Hackett (November 10, 1876 – January 20, 1944) was an American-British playwright.

Biography
Several of his stage works (such as Ambrose Applejohn's Adventure, The Freedom of the Seas, The Regeneration, Hyde Park Corner, The Gay Adventure, 77 Park Lane, The Barton Mystery, It Pays to Advertise and Other Men's Wives) were adapted for film. He was married from 1911 until his death in 1944 to actress Marion Lorne. He was born in Oakland, California, and died in New York City.

Filmography
The White Sister, directed by Fred E. Wright (1915, based on the play The White Sister)
Regeneration, directed by Raoul Walsh (1915, based on the play The Regeneration)
It Pays to Advertise, directed by Donald Crisp (1919, based on the play It Pays to Advertise)
The Barton Mystery, directed by Harry T. Roberts (UK, 1920, based on the play The Barton Mystery)
Whispering Shadows, directed by Émile Chautard (1921, based on the play The Invisible Foe)
The White Sister, directed by Henry King (1923, based on the play The White Sister)
Strangers of the Night, directed by Fred Niblo (1923, based on the play Ambrose Applejohn's Adventure)
Sweethearts and Wives, directed by Clarence G. Badger (1930, based on the play Other Men's Wives)
Captain Applejack, directed by Hobart Henley (1931, based on the play Ambrose Applejohn's Adventure)
It Pays to Advertise, directed by Frank Tuttle (1931, based on the play It Pays to Advertise)
77 Park Lane, directed by Albert de Courville (UK, 1931, based on the play 77 Park Lane)
77 Rue Chalgrin, directed by Albert de Courville (French-language version, 1931, based on the play 77 Park Lane)
Between Night and Day, directed by Albert de Courville (Spanish-language version, 1932, based on the play 77 Park Lane)
 Life Goes On, directed by Jack Raymond (UK, 1932, based on the play Sorry You've Been Troubled)
, directed by Karl Anton (France, 1932, based on the play It Pays to Advertise)
The Barton Mystery, directed by Henry Edwards (UK, 1932, based on the play The Barton Mystery)
The White Sister, directed by Victor Fleming (1933, based on the play The White Sister)
Freedom of the Seas, directed by Marcel Varnel (UK, 1934, based on the play The Freedom of the Seas)
Their Big Moment, directed by James Cruze (1934, based on the play Afterwards)
Road House, directed by Maurice Elvey (UK, 1934, based on the play Road House)
One New York Night, directed by Jack Conway (1935, based on the play Sorry You've Been Troubled)
Hyde Park Corner, directed by Sinclair Hill (UK, 1935, based on the play Hyde Park Corner)
The Gay Adventure, directed by Sinclair Hill (UK, 1936, based on the play The Gay Adventure)
It Pays to Advertise, directed by Anders Henrikson (Sweden, 1936, based on the play It Pays to Advertise)
Take a Chance, directed by Sinclair Hill (UK, 1937, based on the play Take a Chance)
Espionage, directed by Kurt Neumann (1937, based on the play Espionage)
Love Under Fire, directed by George Marshall (1937, based on the play The Fugitives)
The Barton Mystery, directed by Charles Spaak (France, 1949, based on the play The Barton Mystery)
The White Sister, directed by Tito Davison (Mexico, 1960, based on the play The White Sister)

Selected plays
 It Pays to Advertise (1914)
 The Barton Mystery (1916)
 The Freedom of the Seas (1918)
 Mr. Todd's Experiment (1920)
 Ambrose Applejohn's Adventure (1921)
 The Wicked Earl (1927)
 Other Men's Wives (1928)
 Sorry You've Been Troubled (1929)
 Good Losers (1931)
 The Gay Adventure (1931)
 Take a Chance (1931)
 Road House (1932)
 Afterwards (1933)
 Espionage (1935)

References

External links

Walter Hackett profile, Fandango.com
Walter Hackett profile, allmovieguide
Walter Hackett on Great War Theatre, including script of his play 'The Freedom of the Seas'
 

1876 births
1944 deaths
20th-century American dramatists and playwrights
American male dramatists and playwrights
Writers from Oakland, California
20th-century American male writers